Lori Harvey (born January 13, 1997) is an American model, entrepreneur, and socialite. She is the daughter of Marjorie Harvey (née Bridges) and the adoptive daughter of comedian Steve Harvey. She was signed to LA Model Management agency in the United States, as well as Select Model Management in Europe. In 2021, Harvey founded the skincare company SKN by LH.

She has walked the runway for Dolce & Gabbana, and has starred in campaigns for Burberry and Michael Kors. Harvey is currently signed with IMG Models and WME.

Early life 
Lori Harvey is the daughter of Marjorie Harvey (née Bridges). The identity of her biological father is not public knowledge. In 2007, her mother married comedian Steve Harvey, who later adopted her. She was born in Memphis, Tennessee, and grew up in Atlanta, Georgia. Harvey was a competitive equestrian, and aspired to compete at the Olympic Games. She later attended college in Florida, before dropping out due to an injury, which prevented her from continuing her work as an equestrian.

Professional career 
In 2015, she began a career in modeling, signing modeling contracts with LA Model Management agency in the United States, and Select Model Management in Europe. Harvey has walked the runway for Dolce & Gabbana's 2017 Spring/Summer collection; and has appeared in campaigns for Dolce & Gabbana, Michael Kors, Valentino, Pat McGrath's Beauty Lab, and Burberry. In 2019, Harvey made a cameo in the music video for "Motivation" by singer Normani. She has also been featured on the covers of Instagram's The Zine and Wonderland.

In 2021, she launched the skincare brand SKN by LH. That same year, she collaborated on a clothing collection with the company Naked Wardrobe. In May 2022, Harvey posted a video on TikTok explaining her weight loss, which included a daily 1200-Calorie diet leading up to the Met Gala. The video faced criticism from health experts who warned of the potential dangers that participating in the diet could cause someone. In June 2022, Kim Kardashian faced backlash after she announced the launch of a skincare line named SKKN by Kim, which some Twitter users felt was too similar to Harvey's company name. The following month, it was announced that Harvey signed a modeling contract with IMG Models and William Morris Endeavor (WME).

In 2023, Harvey co-starred in singer Usher's music video for single "Glu".

Personal life 

She has close friendships with Jordyn Woods, Normani, Winnie Harlow, and Ryan Destiny, according to Essence.

Relationships 
In January 2016, she began dating Dutch football player Memphis Depay. They were engaged in June 2017 and separated by 2018.

Following the end of her engagement to Depay, Harvey was briefly linked to British racing driver Lewis Hamilton and R&B singer Trey Songz. She was also linked with the rapper Future; the pair confirmed their relationship in January 2020, and broke up in August of that year. Future later took aim at Harvey on his featured verse on the song "Maybach" by 42 Dugg, with the lyrics "Magic City, I'm the owner. Tell Steve Harvey, I don't want her".

In November 2020, Harvey began dating actor Michael B. Jordan. In December 2021, Jordan declared in an interview with The Hollywood Reporter, that he "finally found what love was" with Harvey. In June 2022, it was reported that the couple had ended their relationship. 

In January 2023, Harvey confirmed that she is dating actor Damson Idris.

Legal issues 
In October 2019, Harvey was arrested for fleeing the scene of a collision, according to the Beverly Hills Police Department. In January 2020, a spokesperson from the Los Angeles County District Attorney's office confirmed to People, that she was charged with two misdemeanors, including one count of resisting, obstructing a peace officer and one count of hit and run resulting in property damage. In December 2020, it was reported by TMZ, that she had accepted a plea deal, and was sentenced to 2 years of probation.

References 

1997 births
Living people
American female models
American socialites
People from Memphis, Tennessee
Select Model Management models